Placosternus is a genus of beetles in the family Cerambycidae, containing the following species:

 Placosternus crinicornis (Chevrolat, 1860)
 Placosternus difficilis (Chevrolat, 1862)
 Placosternus erythropus (Chevrolat, 1835)
 Placosternus guttatus (Chevrolat, 1860)

References

Clytini